Posht-e Aresht (also known as Poshteh Arīsht) is a village in Dustan Rural District, Badreh District, Darreh Shahr County, Ilam Province, Iran. At the 2006 census, its population was 23, in 5 families. The village is populated by Kurds.

References 

Populated places in Darreh Shahr County